Stanley John Mullane (12 February 1915 – 27 June 1998) was an Australian rules footballer who played with South Melbourne and Geelong in the Victorian Football League (VFL).

Notes

External links 

1915 births
1998 deaths
Australian rules footballers from Victoria (Australia)
Sydney Swans players
Geelong Football Club players